Rama and the dragon is a novel written by the author Edwar al-Kharrat and was published in 1980. After 16 years of its publishing, it became a trilogy with the publication of the second novel "The Other Time" and the third novel "The Certainty of Thirst" is considered a distinct style of autobiographical writing and one of the best 100 Arabic novels. The novel won the Naguib Mahfouz Medal for Literature.

Plot 
The novel is told as a dialogue between a man and a woman and has mythological, Pharaonic, Greek and Islamic elements mixed together. The novel is a great example of Edwar al-Kharrat's literature in talking about the experimental novel with its own investigations and in-depth research into the aesthetics of the languages, in addition to the writer's reliance on the torrent of awareness technique that permeates the text's fabric through the character of "Rama", which in turn is also deeply rooted with the stream of conciseness technique "Mikhail" and his own thoughts and inner monologues that uncovers many memories.The novel is multi-layered, deep conversations around the human experience and the struggle one faces with polarities wrapped in the story of an unrequited love that Rama and Mikhael live.

About the author 
Edwar al-Kharrat is an Egyptian novelist and art critic born in Alexandria on 16 March 1926. He obtained his law degree from Alexandria university in 1946. He published many studies and translated many articles in various Arab and Egyptian magazines. His novel, Rama and the dragon, was taught in the university of Paris in 1984, and in 1973 he won the "State Award" for Short Stories and the "French-Arab Friendship Award" in 1991.

Critical Review 
Sami Khashabah says in his study about how "Rama and the Dragon is an Egyptian tragedy" and specifically about the importance of "Rama  and the Dragon" novel, and the significance of expressing it through this style of writing: “When Edwar Al-Kharrat wrote this novel, he wrote it in a clear way, expressing the experience of lost love that the Egyptian Coptic scholar lives, whose culture was built around the fact that he is Coptic looking through things in that way, and to his community and language and from his own understanding of his history".

References 

Arabic-language novels
Lebanese novels